Earl Schwab Reisser (May 26, 1899 – September 29, 1956), also referenced as Earl Reiser, was an American football player.  

A Kentucky native, he attended Louisville Male High School where he played at the fullback position for the football team during the 1917 season . 

He served in the United States Navy, though no records have been found reflecting the dates of service.

In 1923, he played professional football for the Louisville Brecks of the National Football League (NFL). He appeared in two NFL games and was listed as a halfback. He was described in November 1923 as "the hardest smashing back of the season." 

Reiser continued living in Louisville and worked as a mechanical draftsman for a plumbing fixture company and later for the American Radiator & Standard Manufacturing Company. He died in 1956 and was buried at Louisville's Resthaven Memorial Cemetery.

References

1899 births
1956 deaths
Louisville Brecks players
Players of American football from Kentucky